While the vast majority of number of volunteer units during the American Civil War were enlisted by the states, a small number were enlisted directly by the Federal government.  These units included regiments like Hiram Berdan's U.S. Sharpshooters and "Galvanized Yankees" recruited from Confederate prisoners of war recruited to fight Indians on the frontier rather than remain in prison camps.

Sharpshooters
1st United States Volunteer Sharpshooter Regiment
Company G, 1st United States Sharpshooters
2nd United States Volunteer Sharpshooter Regiment
Birge's Western Sharpshooters  (variously known as: "Birge's WSS" from Nov 1861-March 1862;  "WSS-14th Missouri Vols" from March 1862- late 1862; and "66th IL Vol Inf (WSS)" from late 1862-July 7 1865. Were initially sworn into service as a non-State aligned unit, as the 1st & 2nd USVSS were, under the personal authority of MG Fremont, Commander of the Dept of the West (placing the regiment in de facto direct U.S. service). Fremont was later found to have exceeded his authority by directly commissioning the Sharpshooters without the authority of the President or a State Governor. In March 1862 they were assigned to the control of the State of Missouri, and the officers were given Missouri commissions. Later the unit was transferred to the control of the state of Illinois as the 66th Illinois Volunteer Infantry Regiment.

Infantry
1st United States Volunteer Infantry Regiment
2nd United States Volunteer Infantry Regiment
3rd United States Volunteer Infantry Regiment
4th United States Volunteer Infantry Regiment
5th United States Volunteer Infantry Regiment
6th United States Volunteer Infantry Regiment

Others
1st Regiment, U.S. Veteran Volunteer Engineers
1st Company, U.S. Volunteer Pontoneers

See also
 Lists of American Civil War Regiments by State

References
The Civil War Archive

 
Volunteer
Civil War